Thiotricha xanthodora is a moth of the family Gelechiidae. It was described by Edward Meyrick in 1923. It is found in Myanmar.

The wingspan is about 8 mm. The forewings are light ochreous yellowish with subcostal, median, and dorsal streaks from the base to about one-third. There is a similar streak along the posterior part of the fold and an ochreous-orange blotch extending along the costa from three-fifths to near the apex, in the middle with a projection meeting a small spot on the tornus. The hindwings are rather dark fuscous.

References

Moths described in 1923
Thiotricha
Taxa named by Edward Meyrick